Trevon Scott (born November 25, 1996) is an American professional basketball player for the Greensboro Swarm of the NBA G League. He played college basketball for the Cincinnati Bearcats.

High school career
Scott played basketball for McIntosh County Academy in Darien, Georgia. His mother did not allow him to play sports unless he received at least a C grade on his progress report. As a senior, he averaged 21.6 points, 14.1 rebounds, 6.5 assists and 3.5 blocks per game, earning Georgia Region 2A Player of the Year honors for his second straight season. Scott left as his school's all-time leading scorer, with 1,824 career points. A three-star recruit, he committed to playing college basketball for Cincinnati over offers from Alabama, Clemson and Georgia, among others.

College career
Scott redshirted his first year with Cincinnati. He was a reserve in his first two seasons, averaging 3.1 points and 3.6 rebounds as a sophomore while shooting 55.4 percent. Scott moved into a starting role as a junior with the departure of Gary Clark. Scott averaged 9.3 points and 6.9 rebounds per game during his junior season. On February 9, 2020, he recorded a career-high 25 points, 13 rebounds and four steals in a 72–71 overtime loss to UConn. Four days later, he scored 25 points again, while grabbing 19 rebounds, in a 92–86 overtime win over Memphis. On February 19, Scott posted 22 points and a career-high 21 rebounds in an 89–87 double-overtime loss to UCF. He became the first Cincinnati player to register a 20-point, 20-rebound game since Kenyon Martin in 1998. As a senior, Scott averaged 11.4 points, 10.5 rebounds, 2.2 assists and 1.5 steals per game, collecting First Team All-American Athletic Conference (AAC), Defensive Player of the Year and Most Improved Player honors. He became the first Cincinnati player since the 1982–83 season to average a double-double. Because the NCAA Tournament was cancelled due to the COVID-19 pandemic, Scott said the end of his collegiate career "will haunt me for the rest of my life."

Professional career

Leones de Ponce (2020)
After going undrafted in the 2020 NBA draft, Scott signed with Leones de Ponce of the Puerto Rican Baloncesto Superior Nacional (BSN) on October 18, 2020.

Salt Lake City Stars (2021)
On December 16, 2020, Scott signed with the Utah Jazz of the NBA, but was waived prior to the season and assigned to their NBA G League affiliate, the Salt Lake City Stars. In his debut, he scored 15 points on 6-of-9 shooting and had six rebounds, two assists and one steal in the Stars' 117–98 loss to the Erie BayHawks. Scott averaged 10.1 points and 5.3 rebounds per game.

Cleveland Charge (2021)
In August 2021, Scott joined the Cleveland Cavaliers for the NBA Summer League and on September 8, he was signed by the Cavaliers. However, he was waived a week later. On October 23, he signed with the Cleveland Charge. In 10 games, he averaged 14.1 points, 6.0 rebounds, 2.4 assists and 1.3 steals in 34.4 minutes per contest for the Charge.

Cleveland Cavaliers (2021)
On December 22, 2021, Scott signed with the Cleveland Cavaliers on a 10-day contract via the NBA’s hardship exception. He appeared in two NBA regular season games.

Return to Charge (2021–2022)
On December 31, 2021, Scott was reacquired and activated by the Cleveland Charge. He averaged 8.4 points, 5.4 rebounds, and 2.1 assists per game.

Ontario Clippers (2022)
Scott was traded to the Ontario Clippers on February 24, 2022 in exchange for the rights to James Palmer Jr., as part of a three-team trade involving the Memphis Hustle.

Fos Provence Basket (2022–2023)
On August 10, 2022, Scott signed with Fos Provence Basket of the LNB Pro A.

Greensboro Swarm (2023–present)
On February 27, 2023, Scott was acquired by the Greensboro Swarm.

Career statistics

NBA

|-
| style="text-align:left;"| 
| style="text-align:left;"| Cleveland
| 2 || 0 || 5.5 || .500 || .000 || — || 1.0 || .0 || .5 || .5 || 3.0
|- class="sortbottom"
| style="text-align:center;" colspan="2"| Career
| 2 || 0 || 5.5 || .500 || .000 || — || 1.0 || .0 || .5 || .5 || 3.0

College

|-
| style="text-align:left;"| 2015–16
| style="text-align:left;"| Cincinnati
| style="text-align:center;" colspan="11"|  Redshirt
|-
| style="text-align:left;"| 2016–17
| style="text-align:left;"| Cincinnati
| 34 || 0 || 10.5 || .500 || .333 || .500 || 2.6 || .6 || .5 || .4 || 3.1
|-
| style="text-align:left;"| 2017–18
| style="text-align:left;"| Cincinnati
| 36 || 0 || 12.5 || .554 || .000 || .596 || 3.6 || .9 || .4 || .2 || 3.1
|-
| style="text-align:left;"| 2018–19
| style="text-align:left;"| Cincinnati
| 35 || 35 || 30.6 || .472 || .308 || .667 || 6.9 || 1.5 || .8 || .5 || 9.3
|-
| style="text-align:left;"| 2019–20
| style="text-align:left;"| Cincinnati
| 30 || 30 || 33.7 || .493 || .288 || .613 || 10.5 || 2.2 || 1.5 || .8 || 11.4
|- class="sortbottom"
| style="text-align:center;" colspan="2"| Career
| 135 || 65 || 21.4 || .492 || .294 || .616 || 5.7 || 1.3 || .8 || .5 || 6.6

Personal life
Scott is the son of Anitra and Eddie Scott. His younger twin sisters, Jada and Jadyn, play college basketball for Cincinnati.

References

External links
Cincinnati Bearcats bio

1996 births
Living people
21st-century African-American sportspeople
African-American basketball players
Agua Caliente Clippers players
American men's basketball players
Basketball players from Georgia (U.S. state)
Cincinnati Bearcats men's basketball players
Cleveland Cavaliers players
Cleveland Charge players
Fos Provence Basket players
Greensboro Swarm players
People from Brunswick, Georgia
Salt Lake City Stars players
Small forwards
Undrafted National Basketball Association players